Kristina Reiss Olson is a psychologist and a professor at Princeton University in Princeton, NJ.  She is known for her research on the development of social categories, transgender youth, and variation in human gender development. Olson was recipient of the 2016 Janet Taylor Spence Award from the Association for Psychological Science for transformative early career contributions, and the 2014  SAGE Young Scholars Award. Olson received the Alan T. Waterman Award from the National Science Foundation in 2018, and was the first psychological scientist to receive this prestigious award honoring early-career scientists. Olson is a member of the 2018 cohort of MacArthur "Genius" fellows.

Biography 
Kristina Olson received her B.A. in Psychology and African and African-American Studies from Washington University in 2003. She completed her PhD from Harvard University in 2008, where she worked with Elizabeth Spelke, Mahzarin Banaji, and Carol S. Dweck. After graduating from Harvard, Olson joined the faculty of Yale University. In 2013, she subsequently moved to the Department of Psychology at the University of Washington where she directs the Social Cognitive Development Lab. Olson's research has been funded through the National Science Foundation, the National Institutes of Health, and the Arcus Foundation. In 2020, Olson joined Princeton University to lead the Human Diversity Lab as a professor in the department of Psychology.

TransYouth Project 
Olson directs The TransYouth Project, which is the largest-to-date longitudinal research study of transgender children, with over 350 children enrolled from across the United States and Canada.  The children in the study group underwent social transition between the ages of 3 to 12, with an average of 6.5 years old. The TransYouth Project "aims to help scientists, educators, parents, and children better understand the varieties of human gender development." Recent findings from this project indicate that transgender children are not confused, delayed, pretending, or oppositional with regards to their gender identity. On tasks, such as the Implicit Association Test (IAT), which measure social knowledge, attitudes, and stereotypes about gender, transgender children respond similarly to "typical" cisgender children who match their gender identity (i.e., their expressed gender). Such findings suggest that the gender identity of transgender children is stable and deeply held.

In research examining mental health outcomes, Olson and colleagues have observed typical rates of depression and only marginally elevated rates of anxiety in transgender children when compared to control groups of children. Such findings contrast with reports of poor mental health outcomes among transgender adults, who frequently experience discrimination and marginalization. In interviews, Olson has emphasized the importance of supportive parents and families in helping transgender youth feel accepted, safe, and secure, especially as they transition through adolescence to adulthood.

Representative publications

References

External links 
 Faculty Home page
Human Diversity Lab
Kristina Olson Social Psychology Network

21st-century American psychologists
American women psychologists
University of Washington faculty
Princeton University faculty
Washington University in St. Louis alumni
Harvard University alumni
Living people
MacArthur Fellows
Year of birth missing (living people)